Saweru is a Papuan language closely related to Yawa of central Yapen Island in Geelvink (Cenderawasih) Bay, Indonesia, of which it is sometimes considered a dialect. It is spoken on Serui Island just offshore.

Unlike Yawa, Saweru lacks an inclusive-exclusive distinction for the first person plural pronoun. Saweru has  'we', while Yawa has  'we (exclusive)' and  'we (inclusive)'.

References

Further reading
Donohue, Mark n.d. Saweru phonology and orthographic guide. Unpublished ms, Department of Linguistics, The University of Sydney.
Donohue, Mark n.d. The variable foot in Saweru. Unpublished ms, Department of Linguistics, The National University of Singapore.
Ayeri, Alfons and Mark Donohue. n.d. Yafan (Saweru) Word List. Unpublished ms, University of Sydney.

Yawa languages
Languages of western New Guinea
Papua (province) culture